Petrit Çeku (born 2 June 1985) is an Albanian classical guitarist.

Biography
Born in Prizren, [[Kosovo
]], Çeku was inspired to play guitar by his father from the age of six. He attended the Lorenc Antoni music school from age 9 to 17, where he took lessons in classical guitar from Luan Sapunxhiu.

In 2002, Çeku was invited by Xhevdet Sahatxhija to study in Zagreb, Croatia, at the Pavao Markovac school of music. In 2008, Çeku graduated from the Zagreb Academy of Music in the class of Darko Petrinjak. From 2009–13 he went on to study with Manuel Barrueco at the Peabody Conservatory in Baltimore, USA.

Çeku has performed many recitals throughout Europe and the Americas and was a soloist with orchestras such as Baltimore Symphony, Czech Chamber Philharmonic, State Hermitage Orchestra of St. Petersburg and Zagreb Philharmonic. He also appears regularly with the famed Zagreb Soloists and is a founding member of Guitar Trio Elogio.
 
He regularly performs at music festivals such as Next Generation Festival, Samobor Festival, Panama Guitar Festival, Moscow Guitar Virtuosi  and Prishtina’s Remusica Festival. He also teaches regularly at the Polish Guitar Academy and the Young Masters Samobor Festival. From time to time, the musician returns to his hometown with concerts and various musical performances.

Petrit Çeku plays on a guitar made by Ross Gutmeier.

Awards

Prizes
 2012 Parkening International Guitar Competition, Malibu, California
 2011 Allentown Symphony Schadt String Competition, Allentown, Pennsylvania
 2011 Maurizio Biasini International Guitar Competition, Bologna, Italy
 2007 Michele Pittaluga International Classical Guitar Competition, Alessandria, Italy
 2005 Ferdo Livadic Competition, Samobor, Croatia, Best Concert Performance
 2004 Andres Segovia International Competition for Young Guitarists, Velbert Germany
 2004 Emilio Pujol Competition, Sassari, Italy
 2003 All Croatia Competition, Dubrovnik, Croatia
 2003 Anna Amalia Guitar Competition, Weimar, Germany

Second Prizes
 2012 JoAnn Falletta International Guitar Concerto Competition, Buffalo, New York
 2006 Parkening International Guitar Competition, Malibu, California
 2006 Printemps de la Guitare, Charleroi, Belgium

Other Awards
 2012 JoAnn Falletta International Guitar Concerto Competition, Buffalo, New York, Audience Favorite and Musicians Favorite Honors
 2008 Zagreb Philharmonic, Best Young Musician of the Year, Zagreb, Croatia
 2005 Ivo Vuljevic Best Young Musician of the Year Award

Discography
Çeku's first CD was released in 2008 at the Naxos label.
His recordings of Bach's complete cello suites, arranged by Valter Dešpalj, were released in 2016 under the Spanish label Eudora

References

1985 births
Living people
Kosovan classical musicians
Kosovan classical guitarists
Musicians from Prizren
21st-century guitarists